Sinești is a commune located in Vâlcea County, Oltenia, Romania. It is composed of six villages: Ciucheți, Dealu Bisericii, Mijlocu, Popești, Sinești and Urzica.

References

Communes in Vâlcea County
Localities in Oltenia